The Woman in Green is a 1945 American film, the eleventh of the fourteen Sherlock Holmes films based on the characters created by Arthur Conan Doyle. Produced and directed by Roy William Neill, it stars Basil Rathbone as Sherlock Holmes and Nigel Bruce as Dr. Watson, with Hillary Brooke as the woman of the title and Henry Daniell as Professor Moriarty. The film follows an original premise with material taken from "The Final Problem" (1893) and "The Adventure of the Empty House" (1903).

This was Hillary Brooke's third of three different roles in the Basil Rathbone Sherlock Holmes films, after Sherlock Holmes and the Voice of Terror (1942) and Sherlock Holmes Faces Death (1943). Series regular Dennis Hoey's Inspector Lestrade was replaced with Matthew Boulton as Inspector Gregson. This was Henry Daniell's third of three different roles in the Rathbone Sherlock Holmes works, following the aforementioned ... Voice of Terror and Sherlock Holmes in Washington (1943).

The film is one of four films in the series which are in the public domain.

Plot
When several women are murdered and their forefingers severed, Sherlock Holmes and Dr. Watson are called into action, but Holmes is baffled by the crimes at the start. Widower Sir George Fenwick (Paul Cavanagh), after a romantic night at the apartment of Lydia Marlowe (Hillary Brooke), is hypnotized into believing that he is responsible for the crimes. He is certain that he is guilty after he awakes from a stupor and finds a woman's forefinger in his pocket. His daughter comes to Holmes and Watson without realizing that Moriarty's henchman is following her. She tells Holmes and Watson that she found her father burying a forefinger under a pile of soil. She has dug up the forefinger and shows it to them.

Fenwick is then found dead, obviously murdered by someone to keep him from talking. Holmes theorizes that Moriarty, who was supposed to have been hanged in Montevideo, is alive and responsible for the crimes. Watson is then called to help a woman who fell over while feeding her pet bird. He leaves, and minutes later, Moriarty appears and explains that he faked the phone call so he could talk to Holmes. When Moriarty leaves, Watson returns. Holmes explains what Moriarty did, notices that a window shade that was shut in the empty house across the street is now open, and tells Watson to investigate.

Inside the empty house Watson, looking through the window, believes that he sees a sniper shoot Holmes in his apartment. Holmes then appears at the house and explains that he put a bust of Julius Caesar there because of the bust's resemblance to his own face (Holmes realized that as soon as he sat there, Moriarty would have him killed). Inspector Gregson takes the sniper, a hypnotized ex-soldier, away, but the sniper is kidnapped and later killed on Holmes's doorstep.

Holmes now realizes that Moriarty's plan involves:
1) killing women and cutting off their forefingers,
2) making rich, single men believe they have committed the crime,
3) using this fake information to blackmail them, and
4) counting on the victims being too terrified to expose the scheme.

He befriends Lydia, whom he had seen with Sir George at a restaurant, suspecting that she is in cahoots with Moriarty. She takes him to her house, where he is apparently hypnotized. Moriarty enters and has one of his men cut Holmes with a knife to verify that he is hypnotized. He then tells Holmes to write a suicide note (which he does), walk out of Lydia's apartment onto the ledge, and jump to his death.

Watson and the police then appear and grab the criminals. Holmes then reveals he was never really hypnotized, but secretly ingested a drug to make him appear as if he had been hypnotized and also insensitive to pain. Moriarty then escapes from the hold of a policeman and jumps from the top of Lydia's house to another building. However, he hangs onto a pipe which becomes loose from the building, causing him to fall to his death.

Cast

 Basil Rathbone as Sherlock Holmes
 Nigel Bruce as Doctor Watson
 Hillary Brooke as Lydia Marlowe
 Henry Daniell as Professor Moriarty ("Moriarity" in closing credits)
 Paul Cavanagh as Sir George Fenwick
 Matthew Boulton as Inspector Gregson
 Eve Amber as Maude Fenwick
 Frederick Worlock as Doctor Onslow 
 Tom Bryson as Corporal Williams
 Sally Shepherd as Crandon, Marlowe's maid
 Mary Gordon as Mrs. Hudson
 Percival Vivian as Dr. Simnell (uncredited)
 Fred Aldrich as Detective (uncredited) 
 Leslie Denison as Vincent (uncredited) 
 Olaf Hytten as Norris (uncredited)

See also
 Hypnosis in popular culture

References

External links

 
 
 
 
 

1940s American films
1940s English-language films
1945 films
1945 mystery films
American black-and-white films
American detective films
American mystery films
Articles containing video clips
Films about hypnosis
Films based on short fiction
Films directed by Roy William Neill
Sherlock Holmes films based on works by Arthur Conan Doyle
Universal Pictures films